Snooker world rankings 1995/1996: The professional world rankings for the top 64 snooker players in the 1995–96 season are listed below.

Notes

References

1995
Rankings 1996
Rankings 1995